The Serie B 1965–66 was the thirty-fourth tournament of this competition played in Italy since its creation.

Teams
Novara, Pisa and Reggina had been promoted from Serie C, while Genoa, Messina and Mantova had been relegated from Serie A.

Final classification

Results

References and sources
Almanacco Illustrato del Calcio - La Storia 1898-2004, Panini Edizioni, Modena, September 2005

Serie B seasons
2
Italy